LolliPop is a 2008 Indian romantic comedy film directed by Shafi and written by Benny P. Nayarambalam. It stars Prithviraj Sukumaran, Kunchacko Boban, Jayasurya, Bhavana and Roma. The film was wide released on 21 December 2008 before Christmas Eve.

Summary
Franco, who runs an automobile workshop, and his sister Jenny, a college student, share a strong bond. Matters take a turn when Franco falls in love with Jenny's enemy Rose.

Plot
(This is the plot of original version not cut version)

The story commences with Panchi, a pickpocket narrating his story to Karunan, a writer. 
Panchi meets Franco who influenced his life and changed him to be better person.

Franco is a young man who runs an automobile workshop by the beach. His sister Jenny is a college student and they share a close bond. Franco's friend Dr. Eby likes Jenny. Jenny has an enemy in college, Rose. Rose and Jenny argue with each other every time they meet. Unknown to Jenny, Franco and Rose are in love, and they are hoping that one day Jenny will come to like Rose.

At this point, Pranchi enters the story. Pranchi tries to pickpocket Franco and is caught red-handed. They both reach the police station and due to some confusion, both end up behind bars. It is the local priest Adv. Fr. Kuriakose, doubling as a solicitor, who bails them out. Kuriakose asks Franco to be Pranchi's friend and to guide him in the right direction. So Pranchi becomes an employee at Franco's workshop.

Pranchi falls in love with Jenny, but Jenny isn't aware of this nor does she have the same feelings towards him. Having made a pact with her brother, she will only marry the guy whom Franco likes and vice versa. She starts liking Eby. When she tells Franco about her liking he goes to see Eby without Eby knowing about it, only to return and tell his sister that Eby did not impress him. Jenny tells Eby this and they sort of break up.

Jenny learns that Franco and Rose are lovers. Jenny feels betrayed. Franco feels guilty and with a heavy heart he ends his relationship with Rose. When Jenny learns about this she feels sad for both Franco and Rose. Jenny meets Rose and patches up with her. Meanwhile, Franco meets Eby and informs that he was against his relationship with Jenny only because he is afraid if Jenny learns that she is adopted, not his real sister. A fact that only Kuriakose and Eby know. Eby happens to be the doctor treating Jenny's real mother at an asylum.

Eby promises that he will never reveal this truth to Jenny. Eby and Rose are childhood friends and neighbours. Eby and Jenny, Rose and Franco get engaged on the same day. A jealous Pranchi with the help of his robber friend mixes sleeping pills in Rose's and Eby's drinks and creates a plot which looked like Eby and Rose had spent a night together. Heartbroken, Franco and Jenny call off their wedding thinking that their partners have betrayed them. Eby and Rose tries to prove their innocence but fails. At the same time, Eby tells Jenny that she is Franco's adopted sister. Franco reveals the truth to Jenny, which makes her heartbroken. When Eby and Rose are unable to prove their innocence, they watch their families forcefully fixing their marriage. Franco announces Jenny's marriage with Pranchi before the wedding date of Eby and Rose, much to Pranchi's joy. At this point, the writer who was listening to Pranchi's story gets angry at him for his nature. But Pranchi proceeds with the story.

On Jenny's wedding day, from Pranchi's friend, Franco learns about Pranchi's trick to marry Jenny. Having caught, Pranchi kidnaps Jenny but Franco comes to saves her. In a fight between Franco and Pranchi, Pranchi dies in an accident. In an interesting twist it is revealed that it was Pranchi's ghost narrating his tale to the writer, and he is joined by the ghost of Chandykunju, Rose's father who dies minutes ago.

Eby and Jenny, Rose and Franco get married and lead a happy life in the same house as both Jenny and Franco have dreamed from childhood so that they will never be separated in their entire life.

By this Karunan realises that Pranchi is a soul. By the realisation he fainted down. In this time, soul of Rose's dad Chandykunju came to Pranchi. The movie ends when Pranchi and Chandykunju looking at Franco and Jenny's happy life.

Cast

 Prithviraj Sukumaran as Franko ("Idiyan" Franko)
 Ganapathi S. Poduval as Young Franko
 Kunchacko Boban as Dr. Eby
 Jayasurya as Pranchi (Francis) 
 Roma as Jennifer (Jenny)
 Bhavana as Rosebella
 Salim Kumar as Fr. / Adv. Kuriakose
 Suraj Venjaramood as Jabbar
 Bijukuttan as Kunjachan
 Narayanankutty as Ambrose
 Rajan P. Dev as Chandykunju
 Jagathy Sreekumar as Novelist Karunan (cameo) (character not included in cut version)
 Shari as Jenny's mother
 Sreelatha Namboothiri as Chandy's mother
 Manka Mahesh as Lilly, Chandy's wife
 Mohan Raj as Damu
 Kollam Ajith
 Baburaj as SI Bharathan
 Anil Murali as CI
 Dinesh Panicker as Dr.Jayaprakash
 Joy John Antony as Suresh
 Raksha Raj as Rosebella's friend
 Kottayam Pradeep

Production
The filming began on 17 August 2008. The main locations are Cochin and Bangkok.

Music
The film's soundtrack contains 6 songs, all composed by Alex Paul. Lyrics were by Vayalar Sarathchandra Varma and Alex Paul.

Deleted scenes
Movie initially had some ghost scenes also. Some scenes of Jayasuriya, Rajan P. Dev and complete scenes of Jagathy Sreekumar were removed from television and digital prints due to poor response from theatre.

References

External links
 LollyPop at Oneindia.in

2000s Malayalam-language films
Films shot in Kochi
Films shot in Bangkok
Films directed by Shafi